Serge Lenoir (born 20 February 1947) is a French former professional footballer who played for Rennes, SC Bastia and Stade Brestois.

References

1947 births
Living people
Sportspeople from Côtes-d'Armor
Association football midfielders
French footballers
Stade Rennais F.C. players
SC Bastia players
Stade Brestois 29 players
Ligue 1 players
Ligue 2 players
Footballers from Brittany